Pierre Alexandre Pastour de Costebelle (Nyons, 20 February 1750Bellone, off Paris, 1791) was a French Navy officer.

Biography 

In November 1782, Costebelle was at Ceylon, in command of Naïade, a 20-gun corvette. 

He took part in the Battle of Cuddalore on 20 June 1783, commanding the 40-gun frigate Consolante.

Sources and references 
 Notes

References

 Bibliography
 
 

External links
 

French Navy officers